Louis John Michel (1825–1904) is the person of which the suburb of Melbourne named Warrandyte was formed upon. He is credited with the first discovery of gold in Victoria. Gold was first discovered in Warrandyte, Victoria at Anderson's Creek in 1851. A cairn was erected in 1938 marking the spot.

References

External links 
 Louis John Michel's biography at the Australian Dictionary of Biography

Australian gold prospectors
1825 births
1904 deaths